Hussainiya may refer to:

 Hussainiya, a congregation hall for Shia commemoration ceremonies

or – amongst others – for the following populated places:
 Husseiniya, Jordan, a department and city in Ma'an Governorate, Jordan.
 Husseiniya, al Sharqia, a province and city in al Sharqia Governorate, Egypt.
 Husseiniya, Iraq, a town in Baghdad Governorate, Iraq.
 al-Husayniyya, Safad, a depopulated Palestinian village.